Mazhar-Fuat-Özkan (MFÖ), also known by their original name Mazhar ve Fuat, is a Turkish pop and rock band with Mazhar Alanson, Fuat Güner and Özkan Uğur as members. While many of their songs poke fun at common Turkish types ("Ali Desidero", "Piskopatım") or satirise prejudice and corruption ("Deli Deli", "Rüşvet"), others are more spiritual in nature, showing their interest in Sufism ("Sufi", "Ateş-i Aşka").

In 1965, Mazhar Alanson and  Fuat Güner first met at a record shop when Alanson saw Güner with a Beatles record in his hand and offered then a stranger Güner to listen the record together. Alanson and Güner would then start to work together and play in the Turkish band, Kaygısızlar, which includes other well known Turkish musicians like Ali Serdar, Semih Oksay, Fikret Kızılok, and Barış Manço. Having also played with Kaygısızlar, Özkan Uğur would start working with other musicians like Erkin Koray, Ersen ve Dadaşlar, and Kurtalan Ekspres after Kaygisizlar separated in 1971.

The same year, in 1971, Mazhar Alanson and Fuat Güner recorded the only album of Mazhar-Fuat. The title of the LP is Türküz Türkü Çağırırız. Following this LP's commercial failure, in 1976, Alanson and Güner formed the band, İpucu Beşlisi, with Özkan Uğur, Ayhan Sicimoğlu, and Galip Boransu, which would separate in 1978.

In 1984, MFÖ would release their first LP Ele Güne Karşı Yapayalnız which turned out to be a big hit. Though, it is accepted MFÖ  is officially established in 1971 when Özkan Uğur first played with Mazhar and Fuat.

Reputation

The trio represented Turkey twice in the Eurovision Song Contest; in 1985 at Gothenburg, Sweden they ranked 14th with Didai Didai Dai, and in 1988 at Dublin, Ireland, performing the song Sufi to finish in 15th place.

Famous Turkish musicians, such as Sertab Erener, Feridun Düzağaç, Sezen Aksu, Gülben Ergen, Gripin, and Hümeyra. played MFÖ song covers in their albums and concerts.

Peter Murphy translated MFÖ song "Buselik Makamına" as "Big Love of a Tiny Fool" in English and included it on a studio album and a concert album.

MFÖ has been involved in many aid campaigns. They have participated in charity events especially on street animals, education, spinal cord paralysis.

Discography

Studio albums 
 Ele Güne Karşı Yapayalnız (1984)
 Peki Peki Anladık (1985)
 Vak The Rock (1986)
 No Problem (1987)
 Geldiler (1990)
 Agannaga Rüşvet (1992)
 Dönmem Yolumdan (1992)
 M.V.A.B. (1995)
 AGU (2006)
 Ve MFÖ (2011)
 Kendi Kendine (2017)

45s and singles 
 Aşık Oldum (I Fell in Love) / Didai Didai Dai (1985)
 Sufi (1988)
 MFÖ (2003)
 Sude (with ER-SEEn) (2019)

Compilation albums 
 The Best of MFÖ (1989)
 Collection (2003)
 MFÖ Box Set (2013)

Concert albums 
 MFÖ Senfonik Konser (2007)

References

External links

Eurovision Song Contest entrants for Turkey
Eurovision Song Contest entrants of 1985
Eurovision Song Contest entrants of 1988
Musical groups established in 1966
Turkish rock music groups
Turkish musical trios
1966 establishments in Turkey